Yo-Ho Kablammo is a pirate themed arena shooter for Xbox Live Arcade, developed by Canalside Studios, the game was released on the Xbox 360 on September 2, 2009. Yo-Ho Kablammo's sequel, Yo-ho-ho Kaboom, was never released.

External links
 Yo-Ho Kablammo at Xbox.com

2009 video games
Microsoft games
Microsoft XNA games
Multiplayer online games
Shooter video games
Video games about pirates
Video games developed in the United Kingdom
Xbox 360 Live Arcade games
Xbox 360-only games
Xbox 360 games